Guui-dong is a dong, neighbourhood of Gwangjin-gu in Seoul, South Korea.

History 
The name Guro-dong comes from a legend that there were nine long-lived old people here. Guro-dong is bordered by Anyangcheon and Seoul Digital Industrial Complex, adjacent to Gwangmyeong-si and Geumcheon-gu, and the outskirts of the Gyeongin Line, Gyeongbu Line, and the southern ring road and the western arterial road are adjacent to each other.

In Guro 3-dong, the Guro Industrial Export Complex, which was a symbol of the chimney industry, has been transformed into a high-tech digital venture valley, and the residential environment is greatly improved due to the redevelopment of old and defective houses. In addition, it is an area where the floating population is rapidly increasing due to the adjoining of venture companies in the digital complex and Seoul subway lines 2 and 7.

See also 
Administrative divisions of South Korea

References

External links
 Gwangjin-gu official website in English
 Map of Gwangjin-gu at the Gwangjin-gu official website
 Guui 1-dong resident office website

Neighbourhoods of Gwangjin District